The Bowls England National Championships (Men's Triples) is one of the events at the annual Bowls England National Championships.

Past winners

References

Bowls in England